The United Kingdom National Quidditch Team, colloquially known as Team UK, was the official national Quidditch team of the United Kingdom.
Team UK made its debut in 2012 at the IQA Summer Games in Oxford, UK where it placed 5th of 5 teams. The team then played in Canada at the 2014 IQA Global Games in Burnaby, BC on July 29, 2014 where it placed 4th of 7 teams and in the European Games in Sarteano, Italy in July 2015, placing 2nd of 12. Team UK gained its first medals at the IQA World Cup 2016 in Frankfurt on July 23–24, 2016, finishing 3rd out of 21 teams.  In 2017 the team gained its first international trophy, winning the IQA European Games, beating France in the final. Team UK's final tournament appearance was a 3rd place medal at the 2019 IQA European Games in Bamberg.

In 2021 Team UK was split into three separate independently managed teams: Team England, Team Scotland and Team Wales.

History

Team UK was formed just in time for the 2012 IQA Summer Games in Oxford, where it competed alongside the United States, France, Australia and Canada. At the time, Quidditch in the UK was very thin on the ground; a few teams in the UK played by IQA rules, namely Avada Keeledavra and the Leicester Lovegoods (now Keele Squirrels and Leicester Thestrals), but they had only just started up that year. Other groups such as the University of Nottingham Quidditch Society and the various College teams at Oxford played by local variations on the rulebook. This meant that the UK was the most inexperienced team represented at the games, with many of its players being free-agents with no game experience. Though the UK came last at the event, roundly defeated by every other team, this event spawned the mass growth of the sport in the United Kingdom. The event was eventually won by the United States with a landslide victory over France in the Final.

The successor event to the Summer Games, the 2014 IQA Global Games, took place in Burnaby, Canada, and again the United Kingdom was represented. An initial round of try-outs selected 42 players who were later divided into the travelling team and the reserves. This event saw the UK compete against the US, Canada, Australia, France, Belgium and Mexico. The two years of intensive growth in the UK since the last appearance of its national team was reflected, and the team won major victories against Belgium and Mexico. Though they were defeated by a wide margin by the US and Canada, the UK forced extra-time against eventual silver-medallists Australia despite eventual loss and soundly defeated old rivals France. The UK was kept from the medal podium by a slight margin, losing the 3rd place playoff against Canada on a snitch-catch. The Global Games, like the Summer Games before them, were won by the Americans, who secured the gold with a wide-margin win over the Australians.

Team UK made its third appearance at the 2015 European Games, the first tournament of its kind. Team selection was made via observation of players in matches during the opening months of 2015, leading up to the British Quidditch Cup. The side finished second in the tournament, losing to France 90*-50 in the final. They topped their group, which included the hosts Italy, Norway, Germany, The Netherlands and Ireland winning every game. Victories followed in the quarter finals against Catalonia and Belgium in the semi finals. Team UK keeper and seeker Ollie Craig was named the MVP (most valued player) of the tournament.

Beginning with the 2015-16 season, a standing national squad was established fluctuating around 35 players who train together on a regular basis and are dropped or called up at the discretion of the captain and coaching staff. Squads for each competition will be selected from this national 'training squad'.

In July 2016, under captain Ben Morton, Team UK attended the Quidditch World Cup, held in Frankfurt, Germany with a squad of 21 chosen from the training squad. UK were one of the top 5 seeds heading into the tournament and lived up to expectations claiming bronze medals, after defeating Canada 190*-60 in the third place play off. The UK topped their group comfortably on day 1 with victories over Turkey, Austria, South Korea and Spain and carried their form into day 2 beating Slovenia and Turkey on the way to a semi-final against the USA. Whilst the UK took an early lead against the USA they were unable to hold onto it and a spot in the final was taken by the USA instead, with the UK losing 140*-40.

In October 2016 a squad of 10 travelled to Odense, Denmark to represent the UK in a friendly match against Norway held as part of the Odense Harry Potter Festival. The friendly was split into 3 games with the UK coming out on top in 2 of the games, winning the first 180*-30 and the second 90-80*, however the Norwegian team fought back to win the final game 110*-100.

In July 2017 Team UK, captained by Bill Orridge, won the IQA European Games, beating France in the finals 90*-70 on a snitch catch by Callum Lake.  Andrew Hull led the UK in the final, notching four of the team's seven goals.  Hosts Norway took third place.

Competitive record

Team UK

Team England, Team Scotland and Team Wales

Players
Where a player's club is listed, the information is accurate at the time of their representation for the event in question. The clubs listed in the 'current national squad' section are accurate for the current season. Where these names have changed over time, the name is given as the club is known now.

Players who represent, or have represented, the UK national team are as follows;

Current National Squad
The following players formed the squad winning the 2017 IQA European Games in Oslo in July 2017.

*Ashley Cooper also acted as head coach of the team in a nonplaying capacity for a total of sixteen games for both European Games 2015 and World Cup 2016.

Squad: World Cup 2012 (Oxford, UK)
The following players are represented the team at the World Cup* in Oxford in Summer 2012, placing fifth of five after a defeat to all other competing countries in the round-robin.

Squad: World Cup 2014 (Vancouver, Canada)
The following players are represented the team at the World Cup* in Burnaby, Vancouver on July 19, 2014, placing fourth of seven after a 60*-40 defeat to Canada in the third-place play-off.

Squad: European Games 2015 (Sarteano, Italy)
The following players are represented the team at the European Games in Sarteano on July 25–26, 2015, placing second of twelve after a 90*-50 defeat to France in the final.

Squad: World Cup 2016 (Frankfurt, Germany)
The following players represented the team at the World Cup in Frankfurt on July 23–24, 2016. Following a 50-90* defeat to Canada in an exposition game two days prior to the event, the UK finished as overall third seed from group play after convincing victories over Turkey, Spain, Austria, and South Korea. The team then progressed past Slovenia and once again Turkey to a 40-130* defeat in the semi-finals against eventual runners-up the USA. Bouncing back quickly, the team won the UK's first ever global podium finish in the third-place game, taking bronze with an emphatic 190*-60 victory over Canada.

Squad: Norway Fixtures at Odense Harry Potter Festival (Odense, Frankfurt)

Squad: European Games 2017 (Oslo, Norway)
The following players represented the team at European Games in Oslo on July 8–9, 2017. Despite a pool play defeat to Belgium at the end of the first day, an impressive overall performance and undefeated second day saw them storm to their first international victory with a 90*-70 defeat of perennial rivals France.

*Rebecca Lowe suffered a pre-tournament injury and did not make any appearances during the tournament, but remained a named member of the squad, was present for every game, and received a winners' medal with the rest of the squad.

''The tournaments in 2012 and 2014 were at the time called Summer Games and Global Games respectively, but are referred to here as World Cup since this has been determined to be the name for the biennially-held worldwide international tournament going forward. The 2016 World Cup was the first to be referred to as such at the time.

See also 

 England national quadball team
 Scotland national quadball team
 QuidditchUK
 International Quadball Association

References

External links

Quidditch national teams
Quidditch
2012 establishments in the United Kingdom
Sports clubs established in 2012
2021 disestablishments in the United Kingdom
Sports clubs disestablished in 2021